The Nördlinger Hut is an Alpine Club hut belonging to the German Alpine Club that is situated at a height of  south of the summit of the Reither Spitze in the Austrian state of Tyrol. It is thus the highest refuge hut in the entire Karwendel range. It is located in the westernmost part of the Karwendel Alps, the Erlspitze Group, above the village and ski resort of Seefeld. From the hut there are expansive views over the Stubai Alps, the Inn valley and the Wetterstein Mountains.

Use 
Thanks to its location and the many tour options that start here, the hut is popular with climbers and hikers as a base for tours over several days, for example crossings of the Karwendel and various summit ascents. It is also used as a destination for day trippers who reach it from the top station of the Härmelekopf cable car. The hut is mainly used, however, as an important base for summit attempts, hut treks and occasional climbing tours. Due to the high risk of avalanches in the surrounding area the hut is not suitable for ski touring; it has no winter room and is closed during the winter.

Summit ascents 
 Reither Spitze up its south flank, easy hut summit, time: 30 minutes.
 Seefelder Spitze via the Reither Spitze, challenging, time: 1½ hours.
 Freiungen, challenging, time: 1½ hours.
 Kuhljochspitze via the Freiungen mountain path, challenging, time: 2½ hours.

References

Literature 
 Walter Klier: Alpine Club Guide Karwendel alpin, 15th edn., 2005, Bergverlag Rudolf Rother, Munich, 
 Dieter Gunn (1997). Around the Zugspitze, Munich, Rother Verlag, pp. 94-96.

External links 
 Home page of the Nördlinger Hut

Mountain huts in Tyrol (state)
Karwendel
Seefeld in Tirol